Actinobole is a genus of dwarf annual herbs in the family Asteraceae described as a genus in 1843.

The entire genus is endemic to Australia, includes:

 Species
 Actinobole condensatum (A.Gray) P.S.Short  
 Actinobole drummondianum P.S.Short  
 Actinobole oldfieldianum P.S.Short  
 Actinobole uliginosum (A.Gray) H.Eichler - flannel cudweed

References

Gnaphalieae
Asterales of Australia
Asteraceae genera